Karrabin is a rural locality in the City of Ipswich, Queensland, Australia.

Geography 
The locality is bounded to the north by the Warrego Highway.

The Rosewood railway line enters the locality from the south-west (Wulkaraka) and exits to the west (Walloon) with Karrabin railway station serving the locality.

The land use is a mixture of rural residential and grazing on native vegetation.

History 
The origin of the suburb name is from the Bundjalung Aboriginal language meaning red gum.

Karrabin State School opened on 4 July 1932 and closed on 15 June 1958.

West Moreton Anglican College opened on 1994.

The median/average age of the Karrabin population is 39 years of age, 2 years above the Australian average.  86.9% of people living in Karrabin were born in Australia. The other top responses for country of birth were New Zealand 2.7%, England 2.1%, Germany 0.6%, Fiji 0.6%, Jamaica 0.6%.  96% of people speak English as their first language 0.6% French, 0.6% Mandarin, 0.6% Greek.

Education
West Moreton Anglican College is a private primary and secondary (Prep-12) school for boys and girls at Keswick Road. In 2018, the school had an enrolment of 1,411 students with 101 teachers (99 full-time equivalent) and 73 non-teaching staff (67 full-time equivalent).

There are no government schools in Karrabin. The nearest government primary schools are Walloon State School in neighbouring Walloon to the west, Leichhardt State School in Leichhardt in Ipswich to the south, and James Blair State School in Sadliers Crossing in Ipswich to the south-east. The nearest government secondary school is Ipswich State High School in neighbouring Brassall to the east.

Economy
There are a number of homesteads in the locality, including:

 Karners
 Larsens

Transport
Karrabin Railway Station provides Queensland Rail City network services to Rosewood, Ipswich and Brisbane via Ipswich.

References

City of Ipswich
Localities in Queensland